The Grand Haven Musical Fountain is a synchronized display of water and lights in Grand Haven, Michigan located on Dewey Hill on the north shore of the Grand River, not far from the Grand's mouth at Lake Michigan and Grand Haven State Park.  Shows run nightly from Memorial Day through Labor Day.  Weekend shows run during the months of May and September.  Shows begin at dark and run 25 to 30 minutes.

The fountain was the brainchild of Dr. William “Bill” Creason, a longtime resident, dentist, and former mayor of Grand Haven. He was a timeless visionary who saw the potential in the beautification of the Grand Haven waterfront. The fountain was modeled after a Przystawic musical fountain show which Bill saw in Germany while providing dentistry for the US Navy after World War II.

Many themes are used in the fountain's performances.  The fountain's narration takes on personas ranging from a 12-year-old girl to a grown man.  A Patriotic themed program runs each July 4 along with fireworks and, in August, a program saluting the United States Coast Guard runs yearly during the Coast Guard Festival; in 2011 a special introduction and closing song were introduced honoring the men and women of the United States Coast Guard.  The special introduction and closing featured music performed by the USCG Band.  Fountain viewing, not including July 4 or the festival, is estimated at around 10,000 annually.

How it works

Designed by a local engineer, William Morris Booth II (who is also the patent holder), and built in 1962 by volunteers (at an estimated cost of $250,000), it was the largest musical fountain in the world at that time. The display comprises a small number of water formations grouped in odd and even segments, with the same formations on each. Augmented by curtains of water at the back and front, a large fanlike array called the Peacock, and three fire hose nozzles - one placed vertically in the center, and the others aimed at an angle from each end - the show produces a simple Dancing Waters style display. Colored lights are arrayed along the front of the fountain in individually controllable groups in red, blue, amber and white, and the back curtain and Peacock sprays have their own lights - green and yellow for the back curtain, and two sets each red, blue and amber for the Peacock. In addition, nozzles called "sweeps" provide the moving effects, swaying side-to-side. A patented drive mechanism allows each pair of sweeps to follow or oppose each other in direction of movement, to move along long or short paths, and to move at any of three speeds, allowing the moving water to follow nearly any kind of music. The original show used punched paper cards, though computers control the new system. The nozzles and pumps have never been changed, only cleaned and cared-for; and shows must still be programmed by hand. 

In 1983 the fountain switched from punch tape to an Allen-Bradly PLC allowing for better control over the valves and lighting. The new control system also introduced using a Radio Shack TRS 80 Model 4 to program shows. Programmers were required to type special commands into a text editor, compile the show script, and then record it out through a 300 baud modem to a four track real-to-real tape unit. The maximum number of command that could be sent to the fountain we 12 per a second. This process took on average took over 200 hours to produce a single 20 minute performance. 

In September 2006, a new PC based programming and playback system was introduced. The Grand Haven Musical Fountain Animated Choreographer was released to the public to encourage the development of new shows and allowed programmers to visually choreograph the fountain. In addition, the new playback system allowed for more complex water and lighting effects by eliminating the need for tape playback by directly controlling the Allen-Bradly PLC. New shows now typically feature over 5000 water and lighting commands in a 20 min. performance. 

In 2017 the software was updated to take advantage on the new lighting and water effects, and is freely downloadable.

Plumbing 
Width: 240 feet
Water basin capacity: 40,000 gallons
Pipe: 8,000 feet long ranging in size from  ¼ inch to 16 inches
Nozzles: 1,300 ranging from 3/16" to 1" in diameter, located in the basin
Capacity:  40,000 gallon basin
Water consumption: 4,000 gallons per minute
 
Maximum height of spray: 125 feet

Lighting

New RGB LED Lighting (Introduced 2013 Season)
Uses 32 RGB fixtures projecting light from the front and underneath
Maximum power consumption of 2,400 watts (averages under 1000 watts)  
LED lighting uses 98% less power and is twice as bright
LED lights can change color at 1/1000 of a second
LED lights can produce 16 million colors

Legacy Lighting
446 lights with a combined power consumption of 116,200 watts
Six colors of lights are used and blended for patterns
Response time for legacy lighting is 1/2 second for full brightness

Sound System Specifications
(32) 18", 600 watt JBL subwoofers
(12) High-frequency JBL horns (30"x 30"x 6' deep)
(14) Power amplifiers (35,000 watts total)
(4) Independent zones of control:
Equalization
Electronic signal distribution
Audio and GPI control supplied by an ENCO DAD professional broadcast audio playout system
Frequency dividing
Power level attenuation
About a mile and a half of cable
Total system output (at the shoreline) in excess of 130 dB
Watts per channel: 12,000

External links
Musical Fountain Schedule & Info
Animated Choreographer Ver 2.0
Grand Haven Coast Guard Festival
Scale Model Grand Haven Musical Fountain

See also 
 Cascade Falls (Jackson, Michigan)

References

Fountains in Michigan
Buildings and structures in Ottawa County, Michigan
Tourist attractions in Ottawa County, Michigan
Musical Fountain
1962 establishments in Michigan